The 2001 Giro d'Italia was the 84th edition of the Giro d'Italia, one of cycling's Grand Tours. The field consisted of 180 riders, and 136 riders finished the race.

By rider

By nationality

References

2001 Giro d'Italia
2001